Suman Deodhar (born 1930, married Suman Athavale) is a female badminton player from India. She is the daughter of India's cricket player D. B. Deodhar.

Career
Suman Deodhar won her first national title in 1946 in the women's doubles with her sister Sunder Deodhar. More titles in the women's doubles followed in 1947, 1951 and 1954. In 1947 she also reached gold in the mixed doubles and in 1951 gold in the women's singles.

Results

References
http://www.badmintonindia.org/frmArcChampionship.aspx?id=0
http://www.thehindu.com/sport/other-sports/article1161833.ece

Indian female badminton players
Indian national badminton champions
Living people
1930 births
Marathi people
Sportswomen from Maharashtra
20th-century Indian women
20th-century Indian people
Racket sportspeople from Maharashtra